Anthenoides is a genus of echinoderms belonging to the family Goniasteridae.

The genus has almost cosmopolitan distribution.

Species:

Anthenoides cristatus 
Anthenoides dubius 
Anthenoides epixanthus 
Anthenoides granulosus 
Anthenoides laevigatus 
Anthenoides lithosorus 
Anthenoides marleyi 
Anthenoides peircei 
Anthenoides piercei 
Anthenoides tenuis

References

Goniasteridae
Asteroidea genera